Safayieh (also Romanized as Safāyīeh) is a village in Karimabad Rural District, Sharifabad District, Pakdasht County, Tehran Province, Iran. At the 2006 census, its population was 90, in 18 families.

References 

Populated places in Pakdasht County